André Mirambel (1 October 1900 – 4 June 1970) was a 20th-century French Hellenist.

He was a member of the Académie des Inscriptions et Belles-Lettres since 1965.

In 1956, André Mirambel won the Prix Langlois awarded by the Académie Française for Tasso Tassoulo et autres nouvelles, by Thrasso Castonakis

Bibliography 
1948: Introduction au grec moderne G. P. Maisonneuve
1949: Grammaire du grec moderne, Klincksieck,  
1953: La littérature grecque moderne, Presses universitaires de France, coll. Que sais-je ?, N°. 560.
1959: La langue grecque moderne : description et analyse, Klincksieck
1960: Petit dictionnaire français-grec moderne et grec moderne-français Maisonneuve et Larose.
1962: La France devant l'hellénisme
1963: Georges Séféris. Prix Nobel 1963

External links 
 André Mirambel on data.bnf.fr
 Éloge funèbre de M. André Mirambel on Persée
 André Mirambel on the site of the Académie française

1900 births
1970 deaths
French hellenists
Translators to French
Greek–French translators
Members of the Académie des Inscriptions et Belles-Lettres
20th-century French translators